The 2015 BWF Para-Badminton World Championships was held from 10 to 13 September 2015 in Stoke Mandeville, England.

Participating countries
232 athletes from 36 countries participated in this edition of Para-Badminton World Championships.

Medalists

Men's events

Women's events

Mixed events

Medal table

References

BWF Para-Badminton World Championships
Para-Badminton World Championships
Para-Badminton BWF World Championships
BWF Para-Badminton World Championships
International sports competitions hosted by England